Peter John Elliott (born 1 October 1943) is a retired Australian bishop of the Catholic Church who served as an auxiliary bishop of the Archdiocese of Melbourne from 2007 to 2018. He is also an author, writing a number of published works that predominantly concern the celebration of Catholic liturgy.

Personal life and background 
Elliot was born and grew up in Melbourne, where his father served as an Anglican priest. Elliott was received into the Catholic Church while a student at the University of Oxford.

Elliot is of partial Sorbian descent. His maternal grandmother came from a family of Lutheran Sorbs who immigrated to the Wimmera region of Victoria, from what is now the German state of Saxony in the early 19th century. Their emigration from Germany was motivated by their dissent from the union of Lutheran and Calvinist churches that had recently taken place there.

Education 
Elliott earned an honours degree in history from the University of Melbourne, where he was a resident student at Trinity College. He was then awarded the Marley Studentship to study at Trinity College Theological School. He later read theology at the University of Oxford, then returned to Australia, studying for the Catholic priesthood at Corpus Christi College, Glen Waverley. In addition, Elliott completed his doctorate in sacred theology (STD) from the Pontifical Lateran University's Institute for Studies on Marriage and Family in Rome, writing a thesis on the sacramentality of marriage.

Ordained ministry

Priesthood 
On 19 February 1973, Elliot was ordained to the priesthood for the Archdiocese of Melbourne by Cardinal Lawrence Joseph Shehan, the Archbishop of Baltimore, during the 40th International Eucharistic Congress which took place in Melbourne and to which Shehan served as papal legate. Elliott then served as an assistant priest in several appointments in the archdiocese as well as secretary to Bishop John A. Kelly from 1979 to 1984.

Ministry in the Roman Curia 
Elliot returned to Rome as an official of the Pontifical Council for the Family at the Vatican, serving for 10 years beginning in 1987. His service to the council included the promotion of marriage and family life at high-profile United Nations conferences.

Elliott has also served in the Roman Curia as a consultator for the Congregation for Divine Worship and the Discipline of the Sacraments and as a member of Anglicanae Traditiones, the inter-dicasterial commission charged with preparing the liturgical books to be used by the Personal ordinariates which Pope Benedict XVI established for Anglican converts to Catholicism.

Episcopacy 
On 30 April 2007, Pope Benedict XVI appointed him an auxiliary bishop of Melbourne and the titular bishop of Manaccenser. He received his episcopal consecration from Archbishop Denis Hart of Melbourne on 15 June 2007, with Cardinal George Pell of Sydney and Archbishop Ambrose Battista De Paoli, the Holy See's apostolic nuncio to Australia, serving as principal co-consecrators.

Following his ordination as a bishop, Elliot served on both the Bishops' Liturgy Commission and the National Liturgical Council of Australia.

Pope Francis announced in November 2018 that he had accepted Elliott's resignation, which was submitted on reaching the retirement age of 75.

Bibliography 

 Prayers of Jubilee: A Personal Prayerbook for Catholics (1976, Our Sunday Visitor)
 The Cross and the Ensign: A Naval History of Malta (1982, HarperCollins)
 What God Has Joined (1990, Alba House)
 Ceremonies of the Modern Roman Rite (1995, Ignatius Press)
 Published the following year in Spanish as Guía práctica de liturgia by Ediciones Universidad de Navarra.
 Ceremonies of the Liturgical Year (2002, Ignatius Press)
 Liturgical Question Box (2018, Ignatius Press)
 Ceremonies Explained for Servers: A Manual for Altar Servers, Acolytes, Sacristans, and Masters of Ceremonies (2020, Ignatius Press)

References

Living people
1943 births
People educated at Trinity College (University of Melbourne)
21st-century Roman Catholic titular bishops
21st-century Roman Catholic bishops in Australia
Converts to Roman Catholicism from Anglicanism
People of Sorbian descent
University of Melbourne alumni
Alumni of the University of Oxford
Pontifical Lateran University alumni
Roman Catholic bishops of Melbourne
Religious leaders from Melbourne